Sárisáp is a village in Komárom-Esztergom county, Hungary.

Rivalry with Annavölgy
Before Annavölgy became an independent town, it used to be part of Sárisáp, this has caused a sort of "rivalry" with the former.

External links
Street map (Hungarian)

Populated places in Komárom-Esztergom County